"Best Friend" by 50 Cent is the third single released from the soundtrack of the film Get Rich or Die Tryin' (2005) and the remix with Olivia is the third single from her album, Behind Closed Doors, which went unreleased. It is also featured on the 2006 edition of 50 Cent's 2005 album, The Massacre.

Background
The song is by 50 Cent and the remix is with Olivia. The song is produced by Hi-Tek. The song also samples the song "Silly, Wasn't I?" by Valerie Simpson from her self-titled 1972 album for its beat. It also constantly makes references to Biz Markie's "Just a Friend" chorus.

The original version of the song is used throughout the film as a way for Marcus (the character played by 50 Cent during Marcus' older years) to lyrically tease/flirt Charlene with, when he passes her the tape with the track on it. The beat in the song is actually different from the real version by 50 Cent. In the movie, the "Best Friend" instrumental is substituted by "The Bridge Is Over" by KRS-One.

Music video
An official music video for the remix was released in 2006, with Olivia appearing. The video also features cameos by G-Unit members Mobb Deep, Spider Loc and Hot Rod.

The video has over 102 million views on YouTube.

Charts

Weekly charts

Year-end charts

Certifications

References

2005 singles
50 Cent songs
Music videos directed by Marcus Raboy
Olivia (singer) songs
Songs written by 50 Cent
2005 songs
G-Unit Records singles
Songs written by J. R. Rotem
Song recordings produced by J. R. Rotem
Contemporary R&B ballads
Songs written by Nickolas Ashford
Songs written by Valerie Simpson
Songs written by Jo Armstead
Songs written by Hi-Tek